Hyejeon College is a private college in HongSeong-Eup, Korea.

See also 
 List of colleges and universities in South Korea
 Education in South Korea

External links 
  

Universities and colleges in South Chungcheong Province
Private universities and colleges in South Korea
1981 establishments in South Korea
Educational institutions established in 1981